Abdulaziz Al Salimi (born 29 September 1991) is a Kuwaiti footballer who is a midfielder for the Kuwaiti Premier League club Al Arabi.

References

1991 births
Living people
Kuwaiti footballers
Al-Arabi SC (Kuwait) players
Sportspeople from Kuwait City
Kuwait international footballers
Association football midfielders
Al-Fahaheel FC players
Kuwait Premier League players